Events in the year 1914 in Japan. It corresponds to Taishō 3 (大正3年) in the Japanese calendar.

Incumbents
Emperor: Taishō
Prime Minister:
Yamamoto Gonnohyōe
Ōkuma Shigenobu

Governors
Aichi Prefecture: Matsui Shigeru
Akita Prefecture: Toyosuke Haneda (until 28 May); Saburo Sakamoto (starting 28 May)
Aomori Prefecture: Takeo Tanaka (until 28 April); Matsujiro Obama (starting 28 April)
Ehime Prefecture: Renarto Fukamachi 
Fukui Prefecture: Teru Kagawa (until 9 June); Sato Kozaburo (starting 9 June)
Fukushima Prefecture: Ota Masahiro 
Gifu Prefecture: Shimada Gotaro 
Gunma Prefecture: Muneyoshi Oshiba (until 28 April); Miyake Gennosuke (starting 28 April)
Hiroshima Prefecture: Terada Yushi 
Hyogo Prefecture: Seino Chotarno
Ibaraki Prefecture: Keisuke Sakanaka 
Ishikawa Prefecture: Kiichirō Kumagai (until month unknown)
Iwate Prefecture: Sadajiro Tsutsumi (until 9 January); Rinpei Otsu (starting 9 January)
Kagawa Prefecture: Kogoro Kanokogi (until 9 June); Takeji Kawamura (starting 9 June)
Kochi Prefecture: Kinjiro Nagai (until 9 June); Toki Kahei (starting 9 June)
Kumamoto Prefecture: Akahoshi Futoshi (until 28 April); Kawakami Shinhare (starting 28 April)
Kyoto Prefecture: Shoichi Omori 
Mie Prefecture: Magoichi Tahara (until 28 April); Eitaro Mabuchi (starting 28 April)
Miyagi Prefecture: Mori Masataka (until 28 April); Magoichi Tahara (starting 28 April)
Miyazaki Prefecture: Tadakazu Ariyoshi
Nagano Prefecture: Ichiro Yoda (until 28 April); Yuichiro Chikaraishi (starting 28 April)
Niigata Prefecture: Ando Kensuke (until 28 April); Keisuke Sakanaka (starting 28 April)
Okinawa Prefecture: Takuya Takahashi (until 9 June); Kyūgorō Ōmi (starting 9 June)
Osaka Prefecture: Marques Okubo Toshi Takeshi 
Saga Prefecture: Fuwa (until 9 June); Raizo Wakabayashi (starting 9 June)
Saitama Prefecture: Soeda Keiichiro (until 9 June); Akira Masaya (starting 9 June)
Shiname Prefecture: Takaoka Naokichi (until 28 April); Ichiro Oriharami (starting 28 April);
Tochigi Prefecture: Okada Bunji (until 5 June); Shin Kitagawa (starting 5 June)
Tokyo: Munakata Tadash (until 21 April); Kubota Kiyochika (starting 21 April)
Toyama Prefecture: Tsunenosuke Hamada 
Yamagata Prefecture: Iwataro Odakiri

Events
January – Siemens scandal breaks out.
February 10–14 large-scale demonstrations erupted in Tokyo in response to the Siemens scandal.
March 24 – Both houses of the Imperial Diet refused to pass the 1914 Navy budget
April 16 – Yamamoto Gonnohyōe resigns as Prime Minister
August 7 – The United Kingdom (Japan's ally since 1902) officially asked Japan for assistance in destroying the raiders from the Imperial German Navy in and around Chinese waters.   
August 23 – Japan declares war on Germany.
August 25 – Japan declares war on Austria-Hungary, after Vienna refused to withdraw the Austro-Hungarian cruiser SMS Kaiserin Elisabeth from Qingdao.
September 2 – Japanese forces landed on China's Shandong province and surrounded the German settlement at Tsingtao (Qingdao)
September 6 – A seaplane launched by the seaplane-carrier Wakamiya. unsuccessfully attacked the Austro-Hungarian cruiser Kaiserin Elisabeth and the German gunboat Jaguar with bombs
October – The Imperial Japanese Navy seized several of Germany's island colonies in the Pacific – the Mariana, Caroline, and Marshall Islands - with virtually no resistance. The Japanese Navy conducted the world's first naval-launched air raids against German-held land targets in Shandong province and ships in Qiaozhou Bay from Wakamiya.
October 17–November 7 – Naval operations around Tsingtao, China.
October 31–November 7 – Siege of Tsingtao concluded with the surrender of German colonial forces.
December 20 – Tokyo Station opened with four platforms; two serving electric trains and two serving non-electric trains.

Births
January 12 – Mieko Kamiya, psychiatrist (d. 1979)
April 16 – Hiro Saga, noblewoman (d. 1987)
May 20 – Hideko Maehata, breaststroke swimmer and first Japanese woman to win an Olympic gold medal. (d. 1995) 
May 30 – Akinoumi Setsuo, sumo wrestler (d. 1979)
June 12 – Go Seigen, Go  player (d. 2014)
July 30 – Michizō Tachihara, poet and architect (d. 1939)
August 2 – Sueo Ōe, athlete (d. 1941)
August 19 – Fumio Hayasaka, composer (d. 1955)
August 25 – Shizuko Kasagi, singer (d. 1985)
September 1 – Tsuneko Sasamoto, photojournalist (d. 2022)
October 1 – Hamao Umezawa, microbiologist (d. 1986)
October 25 – Yukie Arata, freestyle swimmer (d. unknown)
November 3 – Saburo Okita, foreign minister (d. 1993)

Deaths
January 16 – Itō Sukeyuki, admiral (b. 1843)
February 16 – Aoki Shūzō politician and diplomat (b. 1844)
April 9 – Empress Shōken, consort of Emperor Meiji (b. 1849)
November 16 – Shunrō Oshikawa, author and journalist (b. 1876)

See also
List of Japanese films of the 1910s
Japan during World War I
Asian and Pacific theater of World War I

References

 
1910s in Japan
Years of the 20th century in Japan